The Pittsburgh Sleep Quality Index (PSQI) is a self-report questionnaire that assesses sleep quality over a 1-month time interval. The measure consists of 19 individual items, creating 7 components that produce one global score, and takes 5–10 minutes to complete. Developed by researchers at the University of Pittsburgh, the PSQI is intended to be a standardized sleep questionnaire for clinicians and researchers to use with ease and is used for multiple populations. The questionnaire has been used in many settings, including research and clinical activities, and has been used in the diagnosis of sleep disorders. Clinical studies have found the PSQI to be reliable and valid in the assessment of sleep problems to some degree, but more so with self-reported sleep problems and depression-related symptoms than actigraphic measures.

Development and history
The PSQI was developed in 1988, by Buysse and his colleagues, to create a standardized measure designed to gather consistent information about the subjective nature of people's sleep habits and provide a clear index that both clinicians and patients can use. It gained popularity as a measure that could be used in research that looks at how sleep might be associated with sleep disorders, depression, and bipolar disorder.

Scoring and interpretation
Consisting of 19 items, the PSQI measures several different aspects of sleep, offering seven component scores and one composite score.  The component scores consist of subjective sleep quality, sleep latency (i.e., how long it takes to fall asleep), sleep duration, habitual sleep efficiency (i.e., the percentage of time in bed that one is asleep), sleep disturbances, use of sleeping medication, and daytime dysfunction.

Each item is weighted on a 0–3 interval scale. The global PSQI score is then calculated by totaling the seven component scores, providing an overall score ranging from 0 to 21, where lower scores denote a healthier sleep quality.

Traditionally, the items from the PSQI have been summed to create a total score to measure overall sleep quality. Statistical analyses also support looking at three factors, which include sleep efficiency (using sleep duration and sleep efficiency variables), perceived sleep quality (using subjective sleep quality, sleep latency, and sleep medication variables), and daily disturbances (using sleep disturbances and daytime dysfunctions variables).

Reliability

*Table from Youngstrom et al., extending Hunsley & Mash, 2008

Validity

*Table from Youngstrom et al., extending Hunsley & Mash, 2008

Impact
The PSQI now is used by researchers working with people from adolescence to late life. The PSQI is recommended in independent reviews because it has accumulated a substantial amount of research evidence. In addition to the measure's promising reliability and validity, its brevity and accessibility as a free measure allow the measure great potential for clinical practice. To date, it has been translated into 56 languages. The PSQI in Bengali language is also abbreviated as BPSQI where 'B' stands for Bengali.

Limitations

The PSQI has the same problems as other self-report inventories in that scores can be easily exaggerated or minimized by the person completing them. Like all questionnaires, the way the instrument is administered can have an effect on the final score. The PSQI is a relatively new measure and as a result has not received enough investigation to determine the entirety of the psychometric measures.

See also

Epworth Sleepiness Scale

References

External links 

PDF version of PSQI
Tayside children's sleep questionnaire (TCSQ)

Sleep medicine
Mental disorders screening and assessment tools